Saint-Maurice-Navacelles (Languedocien: Sant Maurise de Navacèlas) is a commune in the Hérault department in the Occitanie region in southern France.

Population

See also
Communes of the Hérault department
 Cirque de Navacelles
 Vis (river)
 Château de Saint-Maurice

References

Communes of Hérault